Coyote Creek is a tributary of the Long Tom River via Fern Ridge Reservoir in Lane County in the U.S. state of Oregon. Beginning in hills south of Eugene, it meanders generally north through Gillespie Corners and Crow before entering the reservoir east of Veneta.

Slightly upstream of Crow, the creek flows under Coyote Creek Bridge. The covered bridge, on the National Register of Historic Places since 1979, carries Battle Creek Road over the water.

The creek's named tributaries from source to mouth are Rebel, Jackson, and Doak creeks followed by Fox Hollow.  Then come Bear, Beaver, and Powell creeks followed by Hayes Branch. Further downstream are Jordan, Nighswander, Battle, Sturtevant, and Spencer creeks.

See also
 List of rivers of Oregon

References

External links
Long Tom Watershed Council

Rivers of Lane County, Oregon
Rivers of Oregon